Preaching to the Perverted may refer to:
 "Preaching to the Perverted", by Pop Will Eat Itself from This Is the Day...This Is the Hour...This Is This!, 1989
 Preaching to the Perverted (film), a 1997 British comedy film
 The Best of Pigface: Preaching to the Perverted
 Preaching to the Perverted (The Fuzztones album), 2011